Rex Smith (born September 19, 1955) is an American actor and singer. Smith made his acting debut in the Broadway musical Grease in 1978. He is noted for his role as Jesse Mach in the 1985 television series Street Hawk; being the first actor to play the Marvel Comics superhero Daredevil in live action; and being a singer and stage actor. During the late 1970s, Smith was popular as a teen idol. He was featured regularly in 16 Magazine and Tiger Beat. He also had a gold top 10 single, "You Take My Breath Away", in 1979.

Career

Music
In the early 1970s, Smith was the lead singer for a band from Atlanta called Tricks and later a band named Phaedra. Smith next sang vocals in a hard rock band called Rex.

In 1979, he had a hit single from the television film Sooner or Later, entitled "You Take My Breath Away", which reached No. 10 on the Billboard Hot 100. It is on the platinum-selling album Sooner or Later, which is also named after the film. The music for this song was written by Stephen J. Lawrence and the lyrics were written by Bruce Hart. For many years, it was a staple on the play lists of FM radio stations with a soft rock or "lite" format.

In 1981, Smith hit the top 40 again with a remake of "Everlasting Love", in a duet with singer Rachel Sweet. Peaking at No. 32, the song is Smith's last charting hit to date. The song also became Smith's only hit on the UK Singles Chart, peaking at No. 35.

Smith performed live at the 1982 Miss Universe pageant main event night, held in Lima, Peru.

His latest album was released in 2000 and entitled Simply...Rex. It was re-released in 2006 and re-titled You Take My Breath Away.

In 2016, Rex performed in the Philippines at the Kia Theatre, Araneta Center.

Television
Smith is best known for his role as motorcycle police officer Jesse Mach in the short-running 1985 television series Street Hawk, but he has also made guest appearances on a variety of television shows, such as The Love Boat, Baywatch, Caroline in the City and JAG. Smith has been a celebrity spokesperson for a number of corporate entities.

Also in 1982, Smith replaced Andy Gibb as a host on the music variety show Solid Gold.

In 1989, Smith played Daredevil (also known as Matt Murdock) in the television movie The Trial of the Incredible Hulk. This was intended as a backdoor pilot for an ongoing Daredevil television series (which never materialized at the time). 

From 1990 through 1992, Smith was a contract player on the CBS daytime drama As the World Turns in the role of Darryl Crawford.

Stage
In 1978, he made his Broadway debut in the musical Grease in the lead role of Danny Zuko.

Smith also starred as Frederic in the New York Shakespeare Festival's Central Park production of The Pirates of Penzance. In 1981, Smith won the Theatre World Award for his role in Pirates. Smith reprised the role of Frederic in the 1983 film adaptation, along with fellow Broadway cast members Kevin Kline as the Pirate King, Linda Ronstadt as Mabel and Tony Azito as the Police Sergeant.

Smith has appeared in other Broadway and Off-Broadway productions, including The Scarlet Pimpernel, Grand Hotel, The Human Comedy, and Annie Get Your Gun. He played Joe Gillis opposite Diahann Carroll as Norma Desmond in the 1995 Canadian production of Sunset Boulevard.

In 1995, Smith reprised his role as Danny Zuko throughout the touring production of Grease.

Smith also starred as Fred Graham/Petruchio in the 2001–02 national tour of Kiss Me, Kate.

In 2005, Smith again starred in The Pirates of Penzance, this time playing the role of the Pirate King.

Smith appeared as the Captain in The Sound of Music at the Ogunquit Playhouse, in 2010.

Smith has appeared in non-singing roles in two Neil Simon plays: Plaza Suite opposite Eve Plumb at Judson Theatre Company in 2015 and Barefoot in the Park at Sharon Playhouse in 2018

Most recently, Smith played the role of Billy Mack in the multi-media production Love Actually Live at the Wallis Annenberg Center for the Performing Arts in both 2018 and 2019.

Personal life
Smith has been married four times:
Lois Smith, a Playboy bunny; married from 1978-1983 
Jamie Buell, married on February 28, 1987, and divorced in 1995. The couple have two daughters, Meagan Elizabeth (born 1987) and Madison Marie (born 1990).
Courtney Schrage, married in 1998 and divorced a few years later. She later became her husband's manager. The couple have a son, Gatsby Richard (born 1999), and a daughter, Savannah.
Dr. Tracy Lin, is of Taiwanese heritage and was born and raised in Los Angeles. They were married in September, 2009.

Smith also has a son by Karen Lakey, a record-company representative with whom he had a weekend affair. Their son, Brandon, was born in 1980. Father and son met for the first time in 1997, during Smith's appearance in the musical Sunset Boulevard when he was signing autographs.

Smith is the brother of Michael Lee Smith, the singer of rock band Starz.

Discography

Albums

Singles

Filmography

Film

Television

Stage

References

External links

Rex Smith Interview

1955 births
Living people
American male film actors
American male musical theatre actors
American male television actors
American male pop singers
American rock singers
American soft rock musicians
Ballad musicians
Columbia Records artists
Male actors from Jacksonville, Florida
Musicians from Jacksonville, Florida